The 2017 Trofeo Alfredo Binda-Comune di Cittiglio was the 42nd running of the women's Trofeo Alfredo Binda-Comune di Cittiglio, a women's bicycle race in Italy. It was the third race of the 2017 UCI Women's World Tour season and was held on 19 March 2017; the race started in Gavirate and finished in Cittiglio.

In a reduced field sprint finish,  rider Coryn Rivera from the United States achieved her first World Tour race win, out-sprinting Cuban national champion Arlenis Sierra, while Denmark's Cecilie Uttrup Ludwig completed the podium for the  team.

Teams
25 teams competed in the race.

Results

See also
2017 in women's road cycling

References

External links

2017 in Italian sport
2017
2017 UCI Women's World Tour